Visions of Excess is the second album by the Golden Palominos. The band's line-up was substantially different from their first album. It includes a cover of Moby Grape's "Omaha," with Michael Stipe singing lead.

Critical reception
Trouser Press called Visions of Excess "a brilliant neo-pop album of tuneful, lyrical songs."

Track listing

Personnel
Anton Fier – drums, DMX, percussion (all tracks)
Bill Laswell – bass guitar (all tracks)
Jody Harris – guitars, slide guitar (tracks 1, 2, 4, 5, 6, 7, 8)
Richard Thompson – guitars (tracks 1, 5, 6, 7)
Mike Hampton  – guitar (track 2)
Henry Kaiser – guitars (track 3)
Nicky Skopelitis – guitars (track 7)
Arto Lindsay – guitar, Vocals (Track 8) 
Chris Stamey – guitar, piano, vocals (tracks 1, 2, 3, 6)
Bernie Worrell – Hammond organ (tracks 1, 2, 4, 5)
Carla Bley – Hammond organ (track 7)
Syd Straw – vocals (tracks 1, 5, 6, 7)
Michael Stipe – vocals (tracks 1, 2, 3)
Jack Bruce – vocals, harp (track 5)
John Lydon – vocals (track 4)

References

External links 
 

1985 albums
Celluloid Records albums
The Golden Palominos albums
Albums produced by Anton Fier